Daniel Voiculescu (born 17 October 1956) is a Romanian rower. He competed in the men's coxless four event at the 1980 Summer Olympics.

References

1956 births
Living people
Romanian male rowers
Olympic rowers of Romania
Rowers at the 1980 Summer Olympics
People from Dolj County